Salammbo: Battle for Carthage is a first-person perspective adventure video game. It began development at Cryo Interactive, but the company went bankrupt during production. The Salammbo team was ultimately acquired by DreamCatcher Interactive, which finished the game's development.

Plot

Salammbo: Battle for Carthage is an adaptation of Philippe Druillet's comic series Salammbô, itself adapted from the novel of the same name by Gustave Flaubert.

Development
Salammbo was first announced by Cryo Interactive in July 2002. Many of its team members came from the developer's earlier Atlantis III: The New World. However, Cryo entered a financial downward spiral and filed for bankruptcy protection that same month, leaving Salammbo unfinished. DreamCatcher Interactive ultimately bought sections of Cryo, including the Salammbo team, to form DreamCatcher Europe, and Salammbo resumed development under this new label. 

Salammbo was released for Windows in France,in November 2002. The game is based on the novel Salammbô by Gustave Flaubert and the works of Phillippe Druillet, who was heavily involved in the game's development.

Reception and legacy
The game was reviewed in 2004 in Dragon #319 by Clifford Horowitz in the "Silicon Sorcery" column. Horowitz comments: "Puzzle based, the game is heavy on problem solving and has an intriguing plot that keeps a player's interest from the first scene."

According to Lorraine Lue of DreamCatcher Interactive Europe, Salammbo was commercially unsuccessful, particularly in North America. She noted that "North American players didn't really associate very closely with the characters", a problem she traced back to the game's being "tailored to the French market". In summer 2003, DreamCatcher Europe opted to shutter the game development divisions it had carried over from Cryo. A group of those laid off founded Kheops Studio, led by Benoît Hozjan, in September 2003. Salammbos designer Alexis Lang was among them. Most of Kheops had been involved in Egypt III before its development was interrupted, and so the team sought and received a contract from DreamCatcher to complete the game independently. Several members of Cryo's Atlantis team also migrated to Atlantis Interactive Entertainment—founded around September 2003—to work on Atlantis Evolution, originally an in-house production by DreamCatcher Europe.

References

External links 
 
 Salammbo: Battle for Carthage at MobyGames

Video games based on comics
2002 video games
Cryo Interactive games
DreamCatcher Interactive games
Fantasy video games
First-person adventure games
Microïds games
Phoenicia in fiction
Single-player video games
The Adventure Company games
Video games based on novels
Video games developed in France
Video games featuring female protagonists
Video games featuring non-playable protagonists
Video games set in antiquity
Windows games
Windows-only games
Works based on Salammbô